Elattoneura centralis is a species of damselfly in the family Platycnemididae known commonly as the dark-glittering threadtail. It is endemic to Sri Lanka.

See also
 List of odonates of Sri Lanka

References

External links
Elattoneura centralis. AllOdonata.

Platycnemididae
Damselflies of Sri Lanka
Endemic fauna of Sri Lanka
Insects described in 1860